Aust-Agder is one of the 19 multi-member constituencies of the Storting, the national legislature of Norway. The constituency was established in 1921 following the introduction of proportional representation for elections to the Storting. It consists of the municipalities of Åmli, Arendal, Birkenes, Bygland, Bykle, Evje og Hornnes, Froland, Gjerstad, Grimstad, Iveland, Lillesand, Risør, Tvedestrand, Valle and Vegårshei in the county of Agder. The constituency currently elects three of the 169 members of the Storting using the open party-list proportional representation electoral system. At the 2021 parliamentary election it had 87,300 registered electors.

Electoral system
Aust-Agder currently elects three of the 169 members of the Storting using the open party-list proportional representation electoral system. Constituency seats are allocated by the County Electoral Committee using the Modified Sainte-Laguë method. Compensatory seats (seats at large) are calculated based on the national vote and are allocated by the National Electoral Committee using the Modified Sainte-Laguë method at the constituency level (one for each constituency). Only parties that reach the 4% national threshold compete for compensatory seats.

Election results

Summary

(Excludes compensatory seats. Figures in italics represent joint lists.)

Detailed

2020s

2021
Results of the 2021 parliamentary election held on 13 September 2021:

The following candidates were elected:
Svein Harberg (H); Tellef Inge Mørland (Ap); Gro-Anita Mykjåland (Sp); and Marius Arion Nilsen (FrP).

2010s

2017
Results of the 2017 parliamentary election held on 11 September 2017:

The following candidates were elected:
Åshild Bruun-Gundersen (FrP); Svein Harberg (H); Tellef Inge Mørland (Ap); and Kjell Ingolf Ropstad (KrF).

2013
Results of the 2013 parliamentary election held on 8 and 9 September 2013:

The following candidates were elected:
Freddy de Ruiter (Ap); Ingebjørg Godskesen (FrP); Svein Harberg (H); and Kjell Ingolf Ropstad (KrF).

2000s

2009
Results of the 2009 parliamentary election held on 13 and 14 September 2009:

The following candidates were elected:
Freddy de Ruiter (Ap); Ingebjørg Godskesen (FrP); Svein Harberg (H); and Kjell Ingolf Ropstad (KrF).

2005
Results of the 2005 parliamentary election held on 11 and 12 September 2005:

The following candidates were elected:
Torbjørn Andersen (FrP); Freddy de Ruiter (Ap); Åse Gunhild Woie Duesund (KrF); and Inger Løite (Ap).

2001
Results of the 2001 parliamentary election held on 9 and 10 September 2001:

The following candidates were elected:
Torbjørn Andersen (FrP); Åse Gunhild Woie Duesund (KrF); Gunnar Halvorsen (Ap); and Jan Olav Olsen (H).

1990s

1997
Results of the 1997 parliamentary election held on 15 September 1997:

The following candidates were elected:
Torbjørn Andersen (FrP); Åse Gunhild Woie Duesund (KrF); Gunnar Halvorsen (Ap); and Liv Marit Moland (Ap).

1993
Results of the 1993 parliamentary election held on 12 and 13 September 1993:

The following candidates were elected:
Gunnar Halvorsen (Ap); Brit Hoel (Ap); Tore A. Liltved (H); and Terje Sandkjær (Sp).

1980s

1989
Results of the 1989 parliamentary election held on 10 and 11 September 1989:

The following candidates were elected:
Helga Haugen (KrF); Brit Hoel (Ap); Tore A. Liltved (H); and Jens Marcussen (FrP).

1985
Results of the 1985 parliamentary election held on 8 and 9 September 1985:

As the list alliance was not entitled to more seats contesting as an alliance than it was contesting as individual parties, the distribution of seats was as party votes.

The following candidates were elected:
Asbjørn Andersen (Ap); Astrid Gjertsen (H); Helga Haugen (KrF); and Brit Hoel (Ap).

1981
Results of the 1981 parliamentary election held on 13 and 14 September 1981:

The following candidates were elected:
Osmund Faremo (Ap); Astrid Gjertsen (H); Brit Hoel (Ap); and Johannes Vågsnes (KrF).

1970s

1977
Results of the 1977 parliamentary election held on 11 and 12 September 1977:

The following candidates were elected:
Osmund Faremo (Ap); Astrid Gjertsen (H); Thor Lund (Ap); and Johannes Vågsnes (KrF-V-Sp-DNF).

1973
Results of the 1973 parliamentary election held on 9 and 10 September 1973:

The following candidates were elected:
Osmund Faremo (Ap); Astrid Gjertsen (H); Thor Lund (Ap); and Johannes Vågsnes (KrF).

1960s

1969
Results of the 1969 parliamentary election held on 7 and 8 September 1969:

The following candidates were elected:
Øyvind Bjorvatn (V); Osmund Faremo (Ap); Thor Lund (Ap); and Alfred Thommesen (H).

1965
Results of the 1965 parliamentary election held on 12 and 13 September 1965:

The following candidates were elected:
Øyvind Bjorvatn (V); Osmund Faremo (Ap); Bjarne Henry Henriksen (Ap); and Alfred Thommesen (H).

1961
Results of the 1961 parliamentary election held on 11 September 1961:

The following candidates were elected:
Magnhild Hagelia (Ap), 16,799 votes; Bjarne Henry Henriksen (Ap), 16,794 votes; Berge Helle Kringlebotn (V-Sp), 7,715 votes; and Alfred Thommesen (H), 7,066 votes.

1950s

1957
Results of the 1957 parliamentary election held on 7 October 1957:

The following candidates were elected:
Birger Breivik (KrF); Magnhild Hagelia (Ap); Bjarne Henry Henriksen (Ap); and Alfred Thommesen (H).

1953
Results of the 1953 parliamentary election held on 12 October 1953:

The following candidates were elected:
Magnhild Hagelia (Ap); Bjarne Henry Henriksen (Ap); Arnt J. Mørland (KrF); and Arne Leonhard Nilsen (H-Bp).

1940s

1949
Results of the 1949 parliamentary election held on 10 October 1949:

The following candidates were elected:
Torvald Haavardstad (Ap); Magnhild Hagelia (Ap); Einar Iveland (V); and Olav Kjetilson Nylund (Ap).

1945
Results of the 1945 parliamentary election held on 8 October 1945:

As the list alliance was not entitled to more seats contesting as an alliance than it was contesting as individual parties, the distribution of seats was as party votes.

The following candidates were elected:
Anders Tjøstolvsen Noddeland (V); Olav Kjetilson Nylund (Ap); Aani Aanisson Rysstad (Ap); and Søren Hans Smith Sørensen (H).

1930s

1936
Results of the 1936 parliamentary election held on 19 October 1936:

As the list alliance was entitled to more seats contesting as an alliance than it was contesting as individual parties, the distribution of seats was as list alliance votes. The H-Bp-Fl list alliance's additional seat was allocated to the Farmers' Party.

The following candidates were elected:
Julius Grasåsen (Bp); Torvald Haavardstad (Ap); Jacob Maurice Ørbæk (H); and Christian Stray (V).

1933
Results of the 1933 parliamentary election held on 16 October 1933:

As the list alliance was entitled to more seats contesting as an alliance than it was contesting as individual parties, the distribution of seats was as list alliance votes. The Bp-NS-B list alliance's additional seat was allocated to the Farmers' Party.

The following candidates were elected:
Torvald Haavardstad (Ap); Nils Nersten (Bp); Jacob Maurice Ørbæk (H); and Christian Stray (V).

1930
Results of the 1930 parliamentary election held on 20 October 1930:

The following candidates were elected:
Torvald Haavardstad (Ap); Halvor Rolvsson Olstad (Bp); Jacob Maurice Ørbæk (H); and Torjus Værland (V).

1920s

1927
Results of the 1927 parliamentary election held on 17 October 1927:

The following candidates were elected:
Nils Hjelmtveit (Ap); Halvor Rolvsson Olstad (Bp); Jacob Maurice Ørbæk (H); and Torjus Værland (V).

1924
Results of the 1924 parliamentary election held on 21 October 1924:

The following candidates were elected:
Nils Hjelmtveit (Ap); Nils Nersten (Bp); Lars Olsen Skjulestad (H); and Torjus Værland (V).

1921
Results of the 1921 parliamentary election held on 24 October 1921:

The following candidates were elected:
Aasulv Eivindson Lande] (V); Nils Nersten (L); Lars Olsen Skjulestad (H); and Torjus Værland (V).

Notes

References

Storting constituency
Storting constituencies
Storting constituencies established in 1921